Sirodotia Kylin (1912) is a genus of freshwater red alga which was described by Kylin in 1912, and placed in the Batrachospermaceae family.

The genus name of Sirodotia is in honour of Simon Sirodot (1825–1903), who was a French botanist, algologist and teacher. He was also a Zoologist and Archaeologist, who taught at schools in Toulouse, Strasbourg, Le Mans, Cahors and Limoges.

Taxonomy
The family Batrachospermaceae belongs to the order Batrachospermales and has six well known genera namely Batrachospermum, Kumanoa, Sirodotia, Nothocladus, Tuomeya, and Sheathia. The morphology of the gametophyte of Batrachospermum, Sirodotia, Tuomeya, and Nothocladus are more are less similar to each other. Necchi and Entwisle (1990) proposed to delimit them from generic level to section level of genus Batrachospermum.
Sheathia was the member of genus Batrachospermum and has risen to generic level. phylogenetic studies revealed a distinctive genus level of the above with full support in bootstrap analysis (Vis et al., 1998) and Sirodotia has been raised to generic level.

Description
Attached, gelatinous gametophytic filaments, up to 17 cm long, with a beaded appearance varying from blue-green to yellow-green. Uniseriate central axis with large, cylindrical cells; 4–6 pericentral producing repeatedly branched fascicles of limited growth. In most species, rhizoid-like cortical filaments from lower side of pericentral cells. Each fascicle cell contains several, ribbon-like, parietal chloroplasts with no pyrenoid. Spermatangia budded off terminal fascicle cells, spherical, colorless, 4–7 µm diam. Little differentiated carpogonial branches with small cells. Carpogonia with broad trichogyne attached off-center to base, latter structure having a definite protrusion. Carposporophyte a branched filament creeping along main axis; carposporangia formed at branch apices. Carpospores germinate into Chantransia (= Pseudochantransia) stage, composed of branched, uniseriate filaments. Meiosis and monosporangia not observed.

The genus Sirodotia has been recognized by the two important reproductive characters such as asymmetrical carpogonium in the gametophyte and indeterminate/indistinct gonimoblast filament in the carposporophyte.  Further recognition of species inside the genus is done by various distinct characters like morphology of the gametophyte, position of spermatangia, position of the carpogonial branch, gonimoblast filament arising from the side of from carpogonium, and the size of the carpogonium.

Species
As accepted by Algae Base;
Sirodotia angolensis (West & G.S.West) Skuja 
Sirodotia assamica O.Nechi Jr., Rossignolo, Yasmin, J.A.West & E.K.Ganesan, 2020  
Sirodotia ateleia var. australis Skuja ex T.J.Entwisle 
Sirodotia cirrhosa Skuja ex M.S.Balakrishnan & B.B.Chaugule 
Sirodotia delicatula Skuja
Sirodotia gardneri Skuja ex L.Flint 
Sirodotia huillensis (Welwitsch ex West & G.S.West) Skuja 
Sirodotia iyengarii Balusami & Babu 
Sirodotia loefgrenii Skuja 
Sirodotia polygama Skuja ex L.H.Flint 
Sirodotia segawae S.Kumano 
Sirodotia sinica C.-C.Jao 
Sirodotia suecica Kylin - type species
Sirodotia suecica var. australis Skuja ex T.J.Entwisle 
Sirodotia yutakae S.Kumano C

Former species,
S. acuminata Skuja ex L.Flint, 1951 accepted as Sirodotia suecica 
S. ambigua Skuja ex T.J.Entwisle accepted as Sirodotia suecica
S. ateleia Skuja, 1938 accepted as Batrachospermum ateleium 
S. fennica Skuja, 1931 accepted as Sirodotia suecica
S. goebelii Entwisle & Foard, 1999 accepted as Sirodotia suecica
S. nigrescens (West & G.S.West) Skuja, 1960 accepted as Torularia puiggariana 
S. tenuissima (Collins) Skuja ex L.H.Flint, 1948 accepted as Sirodotia suecica

Distribution
Reported from tropical and temperate countries.

In India, it is reported from Western Ghats and Eastern Ghats.

References

Batrachospermales
Red algae genera